The Jose Piscorski Building is a historic building in Nogales, Arizona. It was built in 1906 by Joseph Piscorski, and designed in the Chicago school architectural style. From 1906 to 1908, the second floor housed the Nogales and Santa Cruz County Board of Trade, and it was later modelled as the San Antonio House Hotel. It has been listed on the National Register of Historic Places since August 29, 1916.

References

External links

National Register of Historic Places in Santa Cruz County, Arizona
Chicago school architecture in the United States
Commercial buildings completed in 1906
1906 establishments in Arizona Territory